Trokavec is a municipality and village in Rokycany District in the Plzeň Region of the Czech Republic. It has about 100 inhabitants.

Geography
It lies on the border between the Brdy Highlands and Švihov Highlands.

References

External links

Villages in Rokycany District